Jan Pára is a retired Czechoslovak slalom canoeist who competed from the late 1950s to the mid-1960s. He won two silver medals in the folding K-1 team event at the ICF Canoe Slalom World Championships, earning them in 1957 and 1959.

References

Czechoslovak male canoeists
Possibly living people
Year of birth missing (living people)
Medalists at the ICF Canoe Slalom World Championships